Schistorhynx is a genus of moths of the family Erebidae. The genus was erected by George Hampson in 1898.

Species
Schistorhynx argentistriga Hampson, 1898 Assam, Khasis
Schistorhynx lobata A. E. Prout, 1925 Borneo
Schistorhynx unistriga Roepke, 1938 northern Sulawesi

References

Calpinae
Moth genera